Ortolyk (Ortolık) is a rural locality (a selo) in Kosh-Agachsky District, the Altai Republic, Russia. The population was 658 as of 2016. There are 9 streets.

Geography 
Ortolyk is located 16 km northwest of Kosh-Agach (the district's administrative centre) by road. Mukhor-Tarkhata is the nearest rural locality.

References 

Rural localities in Kosh-Agachsky District